Second Act is a 2018 American romantic comedy film directed by Peter Segal and written by Elaine Goldsmith-Thomas and Justin Zackham. It stars Jennifer Lopez, Leah Remini, Vanessa Hudgens, Treat Williams and Milo Ventimiglia, and follows a woman in her forties who successfully pursues a second chance at a corporate career, after a friend's son creates a fake résumé and credentials for her. The film received mixed reviews from critics, with praise of Lopez's performance but criticism of the story and the script, and grossed over US$72 million worldwide.

Plot

Maya Vargas (Jennifer Lopez) is the assistant manager of the Value Shop store, where she has worked for the past 15 years. During that time she dramatically improved sales, customer relations, and general store culture through her intuitive and innovative methods. She awaits a store visit by an executive of her company, Mr. Weiskopf, anxiously hoping to be promoted to manager. Her boyfriend Trey, co-workers, and several regular customers all assure her that she is guaranteed the promotion, but she is passed up in favor of Arthur, a non-local company employee with an MBA from Duke. Mr. Weiskopf explains that while he values Maya's dedication and success, she only has a GED and no college degree, which makes her ineligible for the promotion by company policy. Her godson, a skilled computer programmer, rebuilds her background online, giving her a Harvard degree and world travel, and she is hired by one of the store's suppliers, a large cosmetics company. The CEO, Mr. Clarke, has her head a team developing a new product in competition with a team led by his daughter Zoe. During her time with the company, Maya learns that Zoe is the daughter that she gave up after giving birth as a teenager because she couldn't cope with the challenges of parenthood herself.

Cast

Production
In June 2017, Jennifer Lopez signed on to star. In October 2017, Leah Remini, Annaleigh Ashford, Vanessa Hudgens, Dan Bucatinsky and Freddie Stroma joined the cast of the film. In November 2017, Milo Ventimiglia, Treat Williams, Larry Miller, Dave Foley, Charlyne Yi, and Alan Aisenberg were added. Lopez was also a producer.

Filming
Principal photography began on October 23, 2017 in New York City, initially at Food Bazaar Supermarket in Queens, and then continuing in The Bronx and Manhattan, including at Michael Jordan's Steakhouse in Grand Central Terminal. Filming finished on December 15, 2017.

Music
On September 21, 2018, Sia was announced as the composer for the original song "Limitless" for the film's soundtrack, produced by Jesse Shatkin and performed by Lopez. On October 9, 2018, Lopez performed the song at the American Music Awards.

Release 
Second Act was initially scheduled to be released in the United States on November 21, 2018, but in September 2018, following "incredible" test screenings, its distributor STXfilms moved it to December 14, and then again to December 21, 2018.

The studio spent $19–30 million on promotion and advertisements for the film.

Reception

Box office
Second Act grossed $39.3 million in the United States and Canada, and $33 million in other territories, for a total worldwide gross of $72.3 million, against a production budget of $16 million. In order to break-even, the film needed to gross an estimated $30–40 million.

In the United States and Canada, the film was released alongside Aquaman, Welcome to Marwen and Bumblebee, and was projected to gross $9–13 million from 2,607 theaters over its five-day opening weekend. It made $2.5 million on its first day, including $515,000 from Thursday night previews. It went on to debut at $6.5 million for the weekend, finishing seventh at the box office. It then grossed $1 million on Monday and $3 million on Christmas Day, for a five-day total gross of $10.6 million. In its second weekend, it increased by 13%, grossing $7.4 million.

Critical response
The website's critical consensus reads, "Second Act proves Jennifer Lopez remains as magnetic as ever on the big screen; unfortunately, the movie's muddled story isn't always worthy of her gifts." On Metacritic, the film has a weighted average score of 46 out of 100, based on 27 critics, indicating "mixed or average reviews". Audiences polled by CinemaScore gave the film an average grade of "B+" on an A+ to F scale.

Owen Gleiberman of Variety wrote: "Even though Second Act shouldn't work, it does (sort of). It's got flow, a certain knowing ticky-tackiness about its own contrivances. You know you're watching a connect-the-dots comedy, but the dots sparkle. And Lopez gives her first star performance in a while. Age has enriched her talent; she brings curlicues of experience to every scene." Ariana Romero of Refinery29 gave the film a positive review and wrote: "All of the bumps in Maya's life are distractions from the joy of seeing Jennifer Lopez, one of our most charming celebrities, triumph, all while making us laugh and wearing impeccable clothing." Romero also praised the film's costume designers, Patricia Field and Molly Rogers. Keith Uhlich of The Hollywood Reporter wrote that "J.Lo looks movie-star fabulous in her many form-fitting dresses."

Michael Phillips of the Chicago Tribune gave the film 2 out of 4 stars, saying: "Good cast, nearly hopeless script. Second Act hinges on a significant reveal around the midpoint, and it's a lulu in the worst way—preposterously coincidental, outrageously contrived." On Roger Ebert.com, Nell Minow judged it a poor film that "tries to borrow from" Working Girl: "Even the boundless charms of Jennifer Lopez cannot overcome a mess of a script in 'Second Act,' a mishmash that has as much of an identity crisis as its name-switching, past-hiding, resume-inflating main character."

Lopez's performance in the film earned her a nomination for Best Actress at the 2019 Imagen Awards.

References

External links
 

2018 romantic comedy films
2018 films
American romantic comedy films
Films directed by Peter Segal
Films scored by Michael Andrews
Films set in New York City
Films shot in New York City
Nuyorican Productions films
STX Entertainment films
Workplace comedy films
2010s English-language films
2010s American films